Bill Maher: The Decider is Bill Maher's eighth HBO stand-up comedy special. It was filmed on 21 July 2007 at the Berklee Performance Center in Boston, Massachusetts.

Maher talks about various social and political topics, such as the Iraq War, lobbying, sexuality, prescription drugs and religion. The title parodies one of the nicknames of then-U.S. president George W. Bush, and his politics and administration are a main topic of the special.

References

External links
 Bill Maher: The Decider at HBO.com
 
 

2000s American television specials
2007 television specials
HBO network specials
Bill Maher